The K'ómoks First Nation, also known as the Comox Indian Band, is the band government of the Island Comox or K'ómoks people of Vancouver Island, British Columbia, Canada.  Closely allied to the Cape Mudge and Campbell River First Nations, historically they were a Coast Salish people since integrated into Kwakwaka'wakw society.  Originally part of the Laich-kwil-tach Council of Chiefs, which is a treaty society, they are now negotiating independently in the BC Treaty Process.  They remain a member government of the Kwakiutl District Council (a tribal council).

Demographics
The K'ómoks (Comox) First Nation has approximately 330 members.

First Nations reserves
First Nations reserves under the governance of the Kʼómoks First Nation are:
Comox IR No. 7, in Comox District on the North shore of Comox Harbour on the East Coast of Vancouver Island, 58.9 ha. 
Goose Spit IR No. 3, on Goose Spit, Comox Harbour, in Comox Land District, 5.7 ha. 
Pentledge IR No. 2, on left bank of the Pentledge River, at mouth of the Tsolum River, at Courtenay, 83 ha. 
Salmon River (K’ómoks) IR No. 1, at mouth of the Salmon River, on Johnstone Strait, Sayward Land District, 133 ha.

See also
Comox (language)

References

Further reading
 Mitchell, A., Shaw, P., & Miller, D. (2015). "A roadmap to independence: The K’ómoks First Nation comprehensive community plan and developer guidelines". Planning West, 57(2), 20–24. Retrieved from: http://hdl.handle.net/10613/2834

External links
 K'ómoks First Nation

Coast Salish governments
Mid Vancouver Island
Kwakwaka'wakw governments
K'omoks